Native Invader is the fifteenth studio album (twelfth of entirely original material) by American singer/songwriter Tori Amos. It was released on September 8, 2017, through Decca Records. Its lead single, "Cloud Riders", was released on July 27, 2017.

Background
Amos contributed the song "Flicker" for Netflix documentary film Audrie & Daisys ending credits. In a Billboard interview, Amos was asked about future plans, revealing there will be "another album next year. We're in beginning stages and it might be a very different record beginning Nov. 9, but let's see where we're going."

On April 18, Amos began a five-day countdown with a series of Instagram posts depicting a studio and a "sacred fire". On the fifth day, the news was revealed to be a brand new album and world tour.

On April 23, an announcement was posted on Amos' official website, stating:

In terms of what people take away from listening to the album, she has said that she hopes "people take whatever they need, if they’re inspired at all to take anything from it. Whether it’s energy to go create because the only way it became clear to deal with the energy out there that’s getting spewed by so many people is to not become like them. It’s destructive and we’ve seen it destroy people and consume people. Talented people. So that’s not the way. That’s not the way at all.  We have to out-create destructive energy.  That’s the only way, and we can but not one person. It can’t be about one person. It’s about [how] the baton gets passed around and everybody says ‘You know I have something to create today. It might be in the garden. It might be in the kitchen. It might be a sculpture. It might be an article. It might be a book. It might be with children. It could be anything but if it’s slime vomit, that’s everywhere. It’s everywhere. But people have been frozen. [...] We were talking about an emotional taser."

Amos has touched on the background of some of the songs in interviews. Regarding "Up The Creek", she has mentioned that "it’s a phrase that my great grandfather used to say, ‘Good lord willing and the creek don’t rise’ when I would say ‘Are you gonna come back after work and bring all those treats you said you were poppa?’ …I thought to have his great granddaughter on it, there was a thread there that I thought was right.  And she and I talked about the idea that, particularly when America pulled out of the Paris Accord, that’s when "Up The Creek" really started to form itself… We’re talking also about the protectors that are in our agencies that are supposed to be protecting the environment and then Juliana vs the United States... I was guided to these things who’s a friend of a friend who’s a scientist somewhere or somebody who’s been working in government,... a civil servant for years and years and years, and so they would send messages ‘Do you understand what’s happening?’ I would say ‘No, probably I don’t, so can you explain it to me?’ And then they would explain from their point of view what was happening and that is how the record was being shaped by voices of people that felt they couldn’t speak out because of their job because of where they are. So they were trying to shake people into understanding the consequences of what was happening. At the same time, Mary didn’t have a voice. Mary, my mother, by now had become trapped and was voiceless and it became clear that America, our lands, our waters, liberty was trapped, being possessed."

"I think "Chocolate Song" is a song that came out of realizing that once you say something to someone, you can’t take it back and ‘I’m sorry’ just doesn’t fucking do it, does it.  I mean, you think it might but the scars are there.  When you look at that person, you can see that they know.  That’s always there, that thing I said.  And something so simple as being in a kitchen and making chocolate together, which is— you can’t— that experience you can’t even— you can’t purchase it. But the emotional gold of that, and yet once the words become your weaponry, it’s very hard to get back to that.  Really difficult.  So the pain of that, picking up on the pain that I was hearing people were going through was just confrontations.  Confrontations that were fraying people’s emotions and it all got poured back into songs."

Inspiration
In her fan newsletter, it states in summer 2016 Amos took a road trip through North Carolina's Smoky Mountains with intention to reconnect with the stories of her mother's family. That winter, her mother suffered a stroke. With that and the 2016 United States election, the album took a different direction. Amos states, "It wasn't going to be a record of pain, blood and bone when I began. It wasn't going to be a record of division ... I listened and watched the conflicts that were traumatizing the nation and [wrote] about those raw emotions."

Regarding writing the songs, Amos has said that "there’s an intake and an outtake period. That’s when I’m finding works. So there was a deluge for Native Invader after quite a while of waiting for the muses to come. And then once things aligned and there was enough pressure [from] what was going on in the world and what happened to Mary, then all of a sudden, it’s kismet and it all lined up. Now, it doesn’t always work like that where it comes as a rush where I’m working on 7 songs at a time but that’s what started to happen and you start filing really quickly and go ‘Oh, you’re not a part of this structure are you. Oh, no you are! You’re a "Reindeer King"! You’re three different songs at once!"

Other Songs
Amos has said that the deluxe edition bonus tracks "Upside Down 2" and "Russia" "were b-sides. I thought those two were b-sides.  There were a couple songs on this record that were in development. "Black Is The Color". "Stone By Stone". But they weren’t finished. They didn’t get finished and I think that there are a couple more that just didn’t— oh, ‘Baptized Your Love’. [...] It’s not done yet! [...] I’m working on it but it would be a b-side."

Critical reception
Native Invader was well-received from music critics upon release. The album received a score of 76 out of 100 on the review aggregator website Metacritic, based on 14 reviews, indicating "generally favorable reviews".

Reviewing the album for AllMusic, Neil Z. Yeung wrote, "Native Invader stands tall with its own vital voice and energy, alluding to beloved touchstones from throughout Amos' oeuvre while remaining fully of its time."

Pitchfork rated the album positively, claiming that "[Amos'] intricately arranged songs are passionate and despairingly poetic."

Native Invader Tour
To promote the album, Amos embarked on the Native Invader Tour across Europe and North America. The tour began on September 6, 2017 in Cork, Ireland and concluded on December 3 in Los Angeles, California.

In regard to the inclusion of the new songs in the setlists, she had mentioned that "Bang" and "Benjamin" "have to be rearranged because they’re highly produced. People have been asking me, and that’s a fair [...] ask. [...] I think these songs need to come out but they might be very different from the album and that’s why the choices—do we try and figure out an arrangement and bring Rad-Brad in that’s closer to the album? And we have a couple that we are working on to do that. And then, do we, like, with "Benjamin" [...] I just do a version of it at the piano because we have to honor our Benjamins and our lady Benjamins because they’ve been so great and so informative for the record."

Of the songs from the album, she played "Reindeer King", "Wings", "Cloud Riders", "Breakaway", "Wildwood", "Bang", "Climb", "Upside Down 2", and "Russia". "Broken Arrow", "Up The Creek", "Chocolate Song", "Bats", "Benjamin", and "Mary's Eyes" were not performed on tour. "i i e e e" from 1998's From The Choirgirl Hotel and "Reindeer King" were played at most shows, with other catalog songs such as "A Sorta Fairytale", "Precious Things", "Raspberry Swirl", "Bliss", "Blood Roses", and "Cruel" being included more than 10 times across the 49 shows performed.

194 other songs were performed less frequently across the dates. At her Massey Hall performance in Toronto, Ontario, Canada on October 30, she performed a cover of The Tragically Hip's single "Ahead by a Century", two weeks after the death of Tragically Hip lead singer Gord Downie; she indicated in the introduction that she had not previously known the song at all, but learned it especially for the Massey Hall concert as a special gift to her Canadian fans.

With respect to the varying setlist from night to night, which Amos is known for, she said that "the thing about the audience, the people that come to the shows, they give you ideas. They’ll say ‘Well, why don’t you pair this with this?’ You say, ‘OK, we’re gonna go work on it.’ That’s why you have soundchecks. Any artist that you hear that doesn’t go to soundcheck, oh my god. You’ve just missed an opportunity to co-create with your audience. [...] it can be [thrilling but exhausting changing the setlist every night] but hopefully we’ll get past that and it’ll be exhilarating. But the crew will say ‘Why?’ My husband will say ‘Why are you handing me a setlist? This is worthless. You’re going to change it.’ I said ‘I might keep to it.’". "What happens is that time has been slotted for soundcheck, and I can’t go over that time, and that’s how it works.  And it’s not because internally.  It’s just how the building works, and then there’s doors, and everybody has to get in.  So within this hour and a half to two hour window, we have to check the room because every room is different. So we’re making our adjustments on some of the songs that I’m hoping to do that night. Now, if it’s a 'Tori' song that I haven’t done before, then that takes x amount of time to decide "Am I gonna do a new arrangement with the new groovy Big Red?’ [...] The keyboard is a Nord. I just call it a Big Red because [...] it looks like a red Mustang for me. A red Mustang spaceship and I love her so much. But [...] there’s hundreds of sounds in there and then Rad-Brad has to come in and maybe program or change if I like a sound but I get a shout from husband in the front "Sound’s not working out here, wife." Ok so we have to make our adjustments. We’re fiddling, and then I work out the songs, say "Concertina", which I haven’t played yet but it’s a request.  Well, that’s going to take x amount of time. And then somebody will have been running around to get the lyrics to this song and Andy has more records than anybody I know and he’ll have it by then. And he’s with Marcel [van Limbeek] in ‘monitor city’ so that’s my eyeline over here.  And then they’ll play it and I’ll be learning it. I’m running through those sounds and you hear a sound and you think ‘oh okay, [...] the guy or gal outside, their idea [...] could work really well with the sound. Then you holler over to ‘Somebody get production to get the lyrics up for [the requested song] so they’re [printing], running that back up, or somebody has an iPad of course and Andy’s got it. There’s a lot of moving pieces."

Regarding Amos duetting live with her daughter Tash, "I don't think on this tour but [...] in the not so long future. [...] It is one of those things again that kind of has to be something we work up and rehearse.".

Track listing

Personnel

Tori Amos – Bösendorfer piano, Hammond organ, keyboards, vocals, programming, additional instrumentation
Mac Aladdin – guitar
John Philip Shenale – synth programming, additional keyboards (tracks 1 and 13)
Mark Hawley – programming, additional instrumentation
Tash – vocals (track 5)

Charts

References

2017 albums
Decca Records albums
Tori Amos albums